The Supermarine Seal II was a British flying boat developed by Supermarine after it secured a British Air Ministry order for a prototype three-seater fleet spotter amphibian. The prototype, which had to be capable of landing on Royal Air Force (RAF) aircraft carriers, was designed by Supermarine's R.J. Mitchell, who incorporated suggestions made after the Supermarine Commercial Amphibian  achieved second place after it was entered for an Air Ministry competition in 1920.

The Seal II was a biplane with the lower wing mounted on top of the fuselage. Powered by a  Napier Lion water-cooled piston engine, it was the first British flying boat with the propeller positioned in front of the engine. The pilot was seated forward in the nose with the fuel tanks placed behind him, and a second cockpit was located behind the wing.

The Seal II first flew on 21 May 1921 prior to being assessed by the RAF. After being modified and fitted with a different engine, it was renamed the Seagull prior to being delivered to the RAF two months later. In November 1921 the Seal II was one of a number of aircraft sold to the Imperial Japanese Navy Air Service and shipped out with the British-led Sempill Mission to Kasuimiguara.

Background
The flying boats built by Supermarine at their works at Woolston, Southampton, had a reputation for being seaworthy and solidly constructed. They were considered by Flight magazine to be "always of substantial construction, a proper boat-built job, a boat that will fly rather than an aeroplane that will float".

Flying boat designs produced by Supermarine's R.J. Mitchell, later to become the chief designer at Supermarine, and shown to the British Air Ministry, together with the good performance of the Supermarine Commercial Amphibian, resulted in Supermarine winning an order for a prototype three-seater fleet spotter amphibian. The Air Ministry produced specification 7/20 around the prototype aircraft, a biplane that was specified to be capable of landing on Royal Air Force (RAF) aircraft carriers as slowly as possible, with the maximum amount of control.

Design

Hubert Scott-Paine, who owned Supermarine, named the aircraft Seal II. Historians have presumed that this happened because the Commercial Amphibian was briefly designated by Scott-Paine as the Seal I.

Supermarine incorporated suggestions made by the Air Ministry after the company's Commercial Amphibian entered a seaplane competition at Martlesham Heath and Felixstowe in September 1920. Mitchell produced the first drawings for the Seal II, which date from 25 November 1920.

The Seal II was a two-bay biplane with the lower wing mounted on top of the fuselage and the  Napier Lion water-cooled piston engine mounted below the centre-section of the upper wing. It was the first British flying boat propelled with a tractor configuration (with its engine mounted with the propeller in front so that the aircraft is "pulled" through the air). The wings were rearward folding. The fuselage, of a type designed by Linton Hope during the First World War, was roughly circular in cross-section and was built of planking over a framework of formers and stringers covered with fabric, with the planing surfaces built as separate structures, divided into watertight compartments.

The second cockpit of the Seal was located behind the wing, and the undercarriage retractor system was of a new design so that the need for cables was avoided. The pilot, who was protected in his cockpit by a cover, was seated forward in the nose with the fuel tanks placed behind him and in front of the other crew members.

Operational history
The Seal II prototype was allocated the serial N146, and first flew on 21 May 1921. It was officially handed over to the RAF on 2 June 1921, who flew the aircraft to  the Isle of Grain to be assessed.  Following the trials, which were generally satisfactory, the RAF recommended a number of modifications to be made that included moving the position of the fuel tanks from inside the hull to the upper wing, and increasing the size of the rudder and the fin. The aircraft was re-engined with a  Napier Lion II power unit.

Mitchell made further modifications to the Seal II after two prototypes (of specification 21/21) were ordered by the Air Ministry at the beginning of 1922. The prototypes were designated N185 and N159, and renamed as Seagulls on 4 July 1921 prior to being delivered to the RAF. A Seagull was exhibited at the annual RAF Aerial Pageant at Hendon in June 1922. A variant of the Seal, the Fleet Spotting Gunnery Amphibian, was designed by Mitchell, but not built.

Both a Seal II and a Seagull were sold to the Imperial Japanese Navy Air Service when it acquired aircraft after a fact-finding mission in Britain. It was acquired "with a view to experimenting with it under actual service conditions".

Specifications (Seal II)

See also

References

Sources

 
 
 
 

Flying boats
1920s British military reconnaissance aircraft
Biplanes
Seal
Single-engined tractor aircraft
Aircraft first flown in 1921